The Miller test, also called the three-prong obscenity test, is the United States Supreme Court's test for determining whether speech or expression can be labeled obscene, in which case it is not protected by the First Amendment to the United States Constitution and can be prohibited.

History and details
The Miller test was developed in the 1973 case Miller v. California. It has three parts:
Whether "the average person, applying contemporary community standards", would find that the work, taken as a whole, appeals to the prurient interest,
Whether the work depicts or describes, in a patently offensive way, sexual conduct or excretory functions specifically defined by applicable state law,
Whether the work, taken as a whole, lacks serious literary, artistic, political, or scientific value.

The work is considered obscene only if all three conditions are satisfied.

The first two prongs of the Miller test are held to the standards of the community, and the last prong is held to what is reasonable to a person of the United States as a whole.  The national reasonable person standard of the third prong acts as a check on the community standard of the first two prongs, allowing protection for works that in a certain community might be considered obscene but on a national level might have redeeming value.

For legal scholars, several issues are important. One is that the test allows for community standards rather than a national standard. What offends the average person in Manhattan, Kansas, may differ from what offends the average person in Manhattan, New York. The relevant community, however, is not defined.

Another important issue is that the Miller test asks for an interpretation of what the "average" person finds offensive, rather than what the more sensitive persons in the community are offended by, as obscenity was defined by the previous test, the Hicklin test, stemming from the English precedent.

In practice, pornography showing genitalia and sexual acts is not ipso facto obscene according to the Miller test.  For instance, in 2000, a jury in Provo, Utah, took only a few minutes to clear Larry Peterman, owner of a Movie Buffs video store, in Utah County, Utah. He had been charged with distributing obscene material for renting pornographic videos which were displayed in a screened-off area of the store clearly marked as adult-only. The Utah County region had often boasted of being one of the most socially conservative areas in the United States. However, researchers had shown that guests at the local Marriott Hotel were disproportionately large consumers of pay-per-view pornographic material, accessing far more material than the store was distributing.

Criticism

Less strict standard may lead to greater censorship
Because it allows for community standards and demands "serious" value, Justice Douglas worried in his dissent that this test would make it easier to suppress speech and expression. Miller replaced a previous test asking whether the speech or expression was "utterly without redeeming social value". As used, however, the test generally makes it difficult to outlaw any form of expression. Many works decried as pornographic have been successfully argued to have some artistic or literary value, most publicly in the context of the National Endowment for the Arts in the 1990s.

Problem of jurisdiction in the Internet age
The advent of the Internet has made the "community standards" part of the test even more difficult to judge; as material published on a web server in one place can be read by a person residing anywhere else, there is a question as to which jurisdiction should apply. In United States of America v. Extreme Associates, a pornography distributor from North Hollywood, California, was judged to be held accountable to the community standards applying in western Pennsylvania, where the Third Circuit made its ruling, because the materials were available via Internet in that area. The United States Court of Appeals for the Ninth Circuit has ruled in United States v. Kilbride that a "national community standard" should be used for the Internet, but this has yet to be upheld at the national level.

See also
 Artistic merit
 Dost test
 I know it when I see it
 Literary merit
 Nitke v. Gonzales – a case involving Barbara Nitke and the National Coalition for Sexual Freedom regarding Internet obscenity
 Jack Thompson
 United States v. Extreme Associates, Inc.

Notes

References

First Amendment to the United States Constitution
Legal tests
Obscenity law
United States pornography law